"Coffee & TV" is a song by the British rock band Blur. It was written by the band's guitarist, Graham Coxon, who also sang lead vocals rather than frontman Damon Albarn. The song appears on Blur's sixth studio album, 13 (1999), and was the second single released from the album on 28 June 1999. The lyrics describe Coxon's struggle with alcoholism and the song's video, featuring a sentient milk carton searching for Coxon, won several awards. Commercially, "Coffee & TV" reached  11 in the United Kingdom and No. 26 in Ireland. It was a major hit in Iceland, where it peaked at No. 2 in September 1999.

Background and recording
The song, along with the rest of the material for 13, was recorded in late 1998 with producer William Orbit. Coxon wrote the song about his struggle from alcoholism, and how after giving up drinking he would unwind by watching television over a cup of coffee instead and writing songs. This experience also contributed to his first solo album, The Sky Is Too High.

The song's musical style is an anomaly in comparison with the rest of 13, appearing similar to Blur's earlier, Britpop days. Despite featuring heavy guitar distortion and feedback during the instrumental break, major characteristics of 13, the track generally features subdued, calm lyrics and vocals. The edit of the singles cuts off the instrumental part after the fade out and runs about 40 seconds shorter than the album version. This instrumental part is a hidden track, which, though officially untitled, is known as "Coffee & TV Exitlude".

Music video

To promote the single, the band recruited Hammer & Tongs to direct and produce a video. The result featured a sentient milk carton known as "Milky" searching for Coxon, who appeared as a missing person’s face on its side.

The video won several awards in 1999 and 2000 including Best Video at the NME Awards and the MTV Europe Awards. In 2002, the video was ranked the fourth best video of all time by VH1. In 2005, it was voted the 17th greatest pop video of all time in a poll by Channel 4. In 2006, Stylus Magazine ranked it No. 32 in their list of the Top 100 Music Videos of All Time. In a similar poll, NME ranked it the 20th greatest music video of all time. In addition the video received heavy rotation on MTV in the US.

The model of Milky, as used in the video, was sold at an auction of Blur memorabilia in 1999. When Blur played at the London 2012 Olympics Closing Concert Celebration at Hyde Park, fans who bought a Blur T-shirt on the day were given a free replica milk carton of Milky.

Reception
The song reached No. 11 in the UK Singles Chart on 4 July 1999. Blur manager Chris Morrison believed that it was deprived of a top-10 place after it was confirmed that some sales figures were not recorded. The single edit of the song also appeared on Blur's Best Of compilation, released in 2000, and featured on the Cruel Intentions soundtrack.

Piers Martin of the NME selected the track as one of the album's highlights, claiming that it demonstrated that "Graham's a great guitarist and whaddaya know, he's a pretty decent singer". The song was also praised by Straw in Melody Maker. Rolling Stone described the song as a cross between Pavement and Brian Eno circa Taking Tiger Mountain.

Coxon's guitar solo on the track has been singled out for critical praise. In a retrospective review, NME declared the guitar solo to be No. 38 of the top 50 solos of all time, describing it as "a string of discordant notes, building to a storm of haywire string-bending". The Independent described the solo as "one of Coxon’s finest".

Track listings
All music was written and composed by Albarn, Coxon, James and Rowntree. "Coffee & TV" lyrics were composed by Coxon. "Tender" lyrics were composed by Albarn and Coxon. "Bugman" lyrics were composed by Albarn.

UK CD1
 "Coffee & TV"
 "Trade Stylee" (Alex's Bugman remix)
 "Metal Hip Slop" (Graham's Bugman remix)

UK CD2
 "Coffee & TV"
 "X-Offender" (Damon / Control Freak's Bugman remix)
 "Coyote" (Dave's Bugman remix)

UK cassette single
 "Coffee & TV"
 "X-Offender" (Damon / Control Freak's Bugman remix)

UK 12-inch single
A1. "Coffee & TV" – 5:19
A2. "Trade Stylee" (Alex's Bugman remix) – 5:59
A3. "Metal Hip Slop" (Graham's Bugman remix) – 4:27
B1. "X-Offender" (Damon / Control Freak's Bugman remix) – 5:42
B2. "Coyote" (Dave's Bugman remix) – 3:48

European CD single
 "Coffee & TV"
 "Trade Stylee" (Alex's Bugman remix)
 "Metal Hip Slop" (Graham's Bugman remix)
 "Coyote" (Dave's Bugman remix)
 "X-Offender" (Damon / Control Freak's Bugman remix)

Japanese mini-album CD
 "Coffee & TV" (UK radio edit)
 "Tender" (Cornelius remix)
 "Bugman"
 "Trade Stylee" (Alex's Bugman remix)
 "Metal Hip Slop" (Graham's Bugman remix)
 "Coyote" (Dave's Bugman remix)
 "X-Offender" (Damon / Control Freak's Bugman remix)

Personnel
 Graham Coxon – lead and backing vocals, electric guitars
 Damon Albarn – keyboards, acoustic guitar, backing vocals
 Alex James – bass guitar
 Dave Rowntree – drums, percussion

Charts

Certifications

References

 

1998 songs
1999 singles
Blur (band) songs
EMI Records singles
Food Records singles
Song recordings produced by William Orbit
Songs written by Alex James (musician)
Songs written by Damon Albarn
Songs written by Dave Rowntree
Songs written by Graham Coxon